Cooper Island is a small island of the British Virgin Islands in the Caribbean.

There are five privately owned properties on the island, plus a small beach club resort. Cooper Island Beach Club has 12 hotel rooms, a restaurant, rum bar, coffee shop, solar powered brewery, and gift shop. Facilities are open to guests, day visitors and yachts using the nearby moorings. Manchioneel Bay features 30 mooring balls that accommodate vessels up to 60 feet.

Cooper Island is a popular stop for yachts, group tours visiting The Baths on Virgin Gorda, and day boat charters from Tortola, St. Thomas, and St. John.

The island lies adjacent to "wreck alley", a popular wreck diving site in the British Virgin Islands where a number of vessels have been deliberately sunk as dive sites.  A local dive store near the beach club rents tanks to certified scuba divers.

References

External links
 Beach Cottages of Cooper Island
 Cooper Island Beach Club
 Rental Villa Quart-A-Nancy Point, Cooper Island

Islands of the British Virgin Islands